"Never Too Late to Love You" is a song by English band Kissing the Pink, released as both a 7" and 12" single from their third studio album, Certain Things Are Likely (1986). Produced by Peter Walsh, "Never Too Late to Love You" was released as the second single from the album, peaking at No. 87 on the UK Singles Chart, and No. 32 on Billboard's Dance Club Songs chart. The single features the non-album track, "Michael", a song about a sailor, as its B-side.

It was their last single to chart in the UK.

Track listing
7" single
"Never Too Late to Love You"
"Michael"

12" single
"Never Too Late to Love You (Kissing the Mix)"
"Never Too Late to Love You (Extended Mix)"
"Never Too Late to Love You (Instrumental Dub)"
"Michael"

Charts

References

External links
 

Kissing the Pink songs
1986 singles
1986 songs